Cymbidium chloranthum, the green-flowered cymbidium, is a species of orchid.

chloranthum
Plants described in 1843